Robert L. Reffkin is an American entrepreneur who co-founded the online real estate brokerage Compass, Inc. and serves as the company's CEO.

Biography 
Reffkin is African American and Jewish and grew up in Berkeley, California. His father was an African American man from Louisiana, who already had two children, and shortly after Reffkin was born abandoned him and his mother. Emigrating from Israel at age 7, his mother Ruth Reffkin, after having her son, was disowned by her family after learning that their grandson was of African American descent.  Since his mother never married his biological father, his mother gave Reffkin his last name, from her first marriage to Gene Reffkin, also Reffkin's Godfather. His father, a jazz musician, passed away when he was 11 years old.

Through A Better Chance, he was matched with and enrolled in San Francisco University High School, where he also delivered its 2021 commencement address. In 1994, Reffkin started his first business at age 15—a DJ company funded by his bar mitzva and babysitting savings. He was involved with the Network For Teaching Entrepreneurship as a teenager.

In 2000, Reffkin graduated from Columbia University with a bachelor's degree in under two years. After graduating from Columbia, he worked for McKinsey & Company from 2000 to 2002 before returning to school and graduated from Columbia Business School with a M.B.A. in 2003. At the time of his hiring, he was the youngest analyst hired by McKinsey.

He then moved into investment banking and spent two years working for Lazard. Between 2005 and 2006, Reffkin was a White House Fellow and worked for Secretary of the Treasury John W. Snow. He returned to investment banking afterwards as a vice president for Goldman Sachs, becoming chief of staff for President and COO Gary Cohn.

In 2007, Reffkin began laying the groundwork for the philanthropy called New York Needs You (now America Needs You) to mentor low-income college students and help them be successful in their careers by offering career development, college support and summer internships. He did a $1 million fundraising by running a marathon in each of the 50 states in the United States and launched NYNY in 2009.

In 2012, he co-founded the online real estate technology company Compass, Inc. with Ori Allon. The inspiration for his business came from his mother, who suffered hardships working as a real estate agent. Reffkin was inspired to use technology to improve the ability of agents to build their brand, analyze data, and conduct market research to make their business more efficient and profitable.

In April 2021, Compass, Inc. went public and, according to Black Enterprise, Reffkin was projected to become America's youngest black billionaire. His net worth stood at $500 million following the IPO of his company.

Reffkin worked with Peter Koechley, Upworthy co-founder and former managing editor of The Onion, in writing the book No One Succeeds Alone: Learn Everything You Can from Everyone You Can, published in 2021.

References 

Living people
People from Berkeley, California
African-American businesspeople
Jewish American bankers
Jewish American philanthropists
Columbia College (New York) alumni
Columbia Business School alumni
American chief executives
American company founders
White House Fellows
Goldman Sachs people
McKinsey & Company people
Businesspeople in information technology
21st-century African-American people
21st-century American Jews
American chief executives of Fortune 500 companies
1979 births